Reginald Potts (31 July 1927 – 28 January 1996) was an English football defender, nicknamed "Dan" after Desperate Dan.

A key member of Port Vale's history, he played 301 competitive games for the club between 1945 and 1957. He helped the "Valiants" to win the Third Division North title and to reach the FA Cup semi-finals in 1953–54. He later turned out for non-league sides Worcester City and Macclesfield Town.

Career
Potts played for Wellington Scouts, Northwood Mission and Stoke City, before joining Port Vale in August 1945. National service interrupted his career however, and he could only be regularly picked by Vale from February 1952. He did though feature in 19 Third Division South games in 1948–49, and also played three games in 1949–50 and 25 games in 1950–51 under the stewardship of Gordon Hodgson. He scored his first senior goal on 27 March 1950, in a 2–0 win over Torquay United at The Old Recreation Ground.

Potts featured 21 times in 1951–52, as short-term boss Ivor Powell was replaced by Freddie Steele. He was an ever-present during the 1952–53 season, as the "Valiants" finished as runners-up of the Third Division North. He also managed to score a thirty-five yard lob at Vale Park in a 4–0 win over Grimsby Town on 30 April. In the 1953–54 season, the "Iron Curtain" defence of Ray King (goalkeeper), Tommy Cheadle, Potts, Stan Turner and Roy Sproson were a key part of Vale's success in winning the league and reaching the FA Cup semi-finals.

He was an ever-present in the 1954–55 season, as the club posted a 17th-place finish in the Second Division. He also played every game in the 1955–56 season, as part of his 167 consecutive appearances between October 1953 and April 1957. He featured 41 times in 1956–57, as new manager Norman Low failed to prevent Vale slipping to relegation. Former teammate Graham Barnett later recalled how Potts and fellow defender Stan Turner did not get along and refused to speak to each other despite playing alongside each other for eight years. Potts was sold to Southern League side Worcester City in July 1957, later moving on to Macclesfield Town in 1960, becoming a key player for the "Silkmen" until he lost his first team place in February 1961.

Career statistics
Source:

Honours
Port Vale
Football League Third Division North: 1953–54

References

1927 births
1996 deaths
People from Etruria, Staffordshire
Footballers from Stoke-on-Trent
English footballers
Association football defenders
Stoke City F.C. players
Port Vale F.C. players
Worcester City F.C. players
Macclesfield Town F.C. players
English Football League players
Southern Football League players